Antonio Forteguerra, O.S.B. (1648–1714) was a Roman Catholic prelate who served as Bishop of Pienza (1698–1714).

Biography
Antonio Forteguerra was born on 13 Jun 1648 in Siena, Italy and ordained a priest in the Order of Saint Benedict.
On 15 Sep 1698, he was appointed during the papacy of Pope Innocent XII as Bishop of Pienza.
On 21 Sep 1698, he was consecrated bishop by Pier Matteo Petrucci, Cardinal-Priest of San Marcello al Corso, with Francesco Pannocchieschi d'Elci, Archbishop of Pisa, and Domenico Belisario de Bellis, Bishop of Molfetta, serving as co-consecrators. 
He served as Bishop of Pienza until his death in Jan 1714.

References

External links and additional sources
 (for Chronology of Bishops) 
 (for Chronology of Bishops) 

17th-century Italian Roman Catholic bishops
18th-century Italian Roman Catholic bishops
Bishops appointed by Pope Innocent XII
1648 births
1714 deaths
People from Siena
Bishops of Pienza